Danielle Amy Louise Harold (born 30 May 1992) is an English actress. She is known for her role as Lola Pearce in the BBC soap opera EastEnders, which she played from 2011 to 2015, and reprised the role from 2019 to 2023.

Career
Before Harold's acting career began, she was featured in the television series Jamie's Dream School. Harold got one GCSE as she had lost a year of school due to an illness and missed out on being able to study for exams. On Jamie's Dream School, she was seen as one of the brightest of the students, and was rewarded by Jane Poynter and Robert Winston with the chance to stay in the biosphere which Poynter had lived in for two years. She was also given a tour of Cambridge University by David Starkey as he found her to be very intelligent and thought that it might be a good choice of university. However, she decided to study acting and auditioned for several roles.

EastEnders 
In June 2011, EastEnders producers announced that Harold had been cast as Lola Pearce, the granddaughter of established characters Billy Mitchell and Julie Perkins. She made her first appearance in EastEnders on 12 July 2011. Harold's first major storyline involved her character's pregnancy at the age of 15. In July 2012, the character gave birth in a special live broadcast, coinciding with her on-screen grandfather carrying the Olympic Torch through Walford. Harold is the first EastEnders actress to portray giving birth live on air, and the second British soap actress, after Coronation Street actress Jennie McAlpine. In June 2015, it was announced that Harold would be leaving EastEnders later that year.

In December 2018, it was announced that Harold would reprise her role of Lola Pearce. She returned to the series with her on-screen daughter, Lexi Pearce, in April 2019.

Filmography

Awards

References

External links
 
 

English soap opera actresses
Living people
Actresses from London
National Youth Theatre members
1992 births